Julie Lynn Bentley is an American optical physicist who is a professor at the University of Rochester. She is a Fellow of the Optical Society of America and the Society of Photo-Optical Instrumentation Engineers (SPIE).

Early life and education 
Bentley earned her undergraduate and postgraduate degrees at the University of Rochester. Her doctoral research investigated the design and manufacture of gradient-index optical systems.

Research and career 
After her PhD, Bentley moved to the Hughes Aircraft Company, where she spent two years designing optical systems for the defence industry.
Bentley is an educator, researcher and optical design consultant. She started her career at Cornel Tropel, where she designed optical assemblies. Her experience at Corning motivated her to start her own consulting company. She joined the The Institute of Optics at Rochester in 2009. At Rochester, Bentley has developed optical education for both undergraduates and professionals. She has created programs on lens design, aberrations and optical design.

Bentley's research has investigated medical imaging techniques, in particular, the development of open source microscopy systems.

Awards and honors 
 2012 Elected Fellow of SPIE
 2014 University of Rochester Goergen Award for Excellence in Undergraduate Teaching
 2014 Technology Woman of the Year by Digital Rochester
 2019 SPIE Community Champion
 2020 SPIE Community Champion
 2020 Elected Fellow of Optica
 2022 Optica Esther Hoffman Beller Medal
 2022 SPIE Director's Award

Selected publications

References 

Year of birth missing (living people)
Living people
American women physicists
20th-century American physicists
20th-century American women scientists
21st-century American physicists
21st-century American women scientists
Optical physicists
Hughes Aircraft Company
University of Rochester alumni
University of Rochester faculty
Fellows of Optica (society)
Fellows of SPIE